Karabudakhkentsky District (Qarabudağgentli yaq) is an administrative and municipal district (raion), one of the forty-one in the Republic of Dagestan, Russia. It is located in the east of the republic. Its administrative center is the rural locality (a selo) of Karabudakhkent. As of the 2010 Census, the total population of the district was 73,016, with the population of Karabudakhkent accounting for 21.0% of that number.

History
The district was established by the Central Executive Committee decree on January 20, 1921. It underwent numerous changes during the following years and was established in its present borders in 1965 as Leninsky District. In 1992, it was renamed Karabudakhkentsky District.

Administrative and municipal status
Within the framework of administrative divisions, Karabudakhkentsky District is one of the forty-one in the Republic of Dagestan. It is divided into two settlements (administrative divisions with the administrative centers in the urban-type settlements (inhabited localities) of Achi-Su and Manas) and three selsoviets, which comprise sixteen rural localities. As a municipal division, the district is incorporated as Karabudakhkentsky Municipal District. The settlements are incorporated as urban settlements, and the three selsoviets are incorporated as twelve rural settlements within the municipal district. The selo of Karabudakhkent serves as the administrative center of both the administrative and municipal district.

References

Notes

Sources

Districts of Dagestan